The German Association for Medical Education (German: Gesellschaft für Medizinische Ausbildung) is a non-profit organization to promote interdisciplinary advancement of medical education in German speaking countries. GMA is a member of the Association of the Scientific Medical Societies in Germany and the Association for Medical Education in Europe (AMEE). It was founded on April 22, 1978.

Cooperations 
Among other organizations, the GMA cooperates with:
 Medizinischer Fakultätentag (MFT)
 Association of the Scientific Medical Societies in Germany (AWMF)
 Bundesvertretung der Medizinstudierenden in Deutschland (bvmd)
 Association for Medical Education in Europe (AMEE)

Presidents 
 Fritz Kemper (1978 – 1982)
 Jörg-Dietrich Hoppe (1982 – 1986)
 Dietrich Habeck (1986 – 1994)
 Florian Eitel (1994 – 2003)
 Eckard G. Hahn (2003 – 2011)
 Martin R. Fischer (2011 – present)

Annual conferences 
 2004: Berlin, Germany
 2005: Münster, Germany
 2006: Cologne, Germany
 2007: Hanover, Germany
 2008: Greifswald, Germany
 2009: Freiburg, Germany
 2010: Bochum, Germany
 2011: Munich, Germany
 2012: Aachen, Germany
 2013: Graz, Austria
 2014: Hamburg, Germany
 2015: Leipzig, Germany
 2016: Bern, Switzerland
 2017: Münster, Germany
 2018: Vienna, Austria
 2019: Frankfurt, Germany
 2020: Zürich, Switzerland (cancelled)
 2021: online
 2022: Halle (Saale), Germany
 2023: Osnabrück, Germany

References

External links 
 Official website in English

Medical and health organisations based in Bavaria
Organizations established in 1978
1978 establishments in West Germany
Educational organisations based in Germany